A peat pulp bath is a bath prepared of peat pulp from wetlands. Balneotherapy in form of peat pulp baths is offered in many health resorts.

History 
Paracelsus described "moor" as a remedy for certain diseases. Later, soldiers of Napoleon learnt about peat pulp and mud baths in Egypt and brought this knowledge to Europe. Jérôme Bonaparte, Napoleon's brother gave command to erect the first health resort with peat applications for his troops after the Battle of Leipzig in Bad Nenndorf. However, an earlier peat pulp resort has been alleged to have existed in Bad Pyrmont in 1802. In the 19th century, peat pulp resorts have been founded in many European health resorts including Marienbad (1813), Franzensbad (1827), Karlsbad (1836) and Bad Aibling (1845).

See also
Balneotherapy
Bath salts
Mud-bath
Peloid

References 
 Online textbook on Peat therapeutics and balneotherapy
 How Peloid Procedures Work and What They Are Made Of

Balneotherapy
Bathing
Peat